The Feud Maker is a 1938 American Western film directed by Sam Newfield.

Plot

Cast
Bob Steele as Texas Ryan aka Wind River Kid
Marion Weldon as Sally Harbison
Karl Hackett as Rand Lassiter / Ross Landers
Frank Ball as Ben Harbison
Budd Buster as 'Cowlick' Connors
Lew Meehan as Jake Slaven
Roger Williams as Sheriff Manton
Forrest Taylor as Marshal John Kincaid
Jack C. Smith as Nelson
Steve Clark as Mark - Cowhand
Lloyd Ingraham as Hank Younger

See also
Bob Steele filmography

External links
 

1938 films
1938 Western (genre) films
1930s English-language films
American black-and-white films
Republic Pictures films
American Western (genre) films
Films with screenplays by George H. Plympton
Films directed by Sam Newfield
1930s American films